"Sub-culture" is a song by English rock band New Order. It was released as the second and final single from their third studio album, Low-Life (1985) on 28 October 1985 by Factory Records.

Release
The single release, remixed by John Robie, is a drastic departure from the album version of the track. Robie's 12" and 7" single mixes feature more club-oriented, electronic instrumentation and prominent soulful female backing vocals.

The B-side is an instrumental remix titled "Dub-vulture". A seven-inch edit of the Robie remix taken from the Benelux version of the "Sub-culture" single appears on the group's 1987 compilation, Substance.

A collection of Razormaid remixes of the track were released in 1986, which include additional vocals by Deborah Iyall of Romeo Void.

Making use of the word shaft with its possible sexual connotations, the song seems to be about sexual rejection, loneliness and alienation in an urban environment.

Artwork
"Sub-culture" has only a regular black sleeve, as graphic designer Peter Saville reportedly deemed the mix of the song unworthy of his talents. Saville's input was present only in a P/S/A (Peter Saville Associates) credit for typography.
However this rumour was debunked in 2017 when Saville stated, "I never had the authority to say that there shouldn't be a sleeve. No, all I can presume is that one was not asked for."

Track listing

UK 7" free with Record Mirror - RM2
 New Order: "Sub-culture" (exclusive remix) – 4:14
 Raymonde: "Jennifer Wants" (exclusive track) – 2:02
 Hipsway: "Bad Thing Longing" (preview from their forthcoming album) – 4:09
 Adventures: "Walk Away Renee" (specially recorded for RM) – 3:11

Chart positions

References

New Order (band) songs
1985 singles
1985 songs
Songs written by Bernard Sumner
Songs written by Peter Hook
Songs written by Stephen Morris (musician)
Songs written by Gillian Gilbert
Factory Records singles
UK Independent Singles Chart number-one singles